Princess (Leult) Sifrash Bizu (commonly referred to as Princess Sifrash) is a daughter of Emperor-in-exile Amha Selassie of Ethiopia by Empress Medferiashwork Abebe, his second wife. She is a granddaughter of Emperor Haile Selassie of Ethiopia.

Princess Sifrash Bizu married Ato Fasil Araya, Secretary General of the Awasa Chamber of Commerce. They had two daughters:

 Immabet Aida Fasil. 
 Immabet Rebecca Fasil.

Patronages 
 President of the Haile Selassie Foundation.

Honours

National honours 
  Emperor Haile Selassie I Jubilee Medal (1966).

Ancestry

References

Sifrash Bizu, Princess
Sifrash Bizu, Princess
Living people
Haile Selassie
1959 births